Thunbergioideae is a subfamily of plants in the family Acanthaceae.

Genera
The USDA-ARS Germplasm Resources Information Network (GRIN) includes:
 Anomacanthus R.D.Good
 Mendoncia Vell. ex Vand.
 Pseudocalyx Radlk.
 Thunbergia Retz. (synonym Meyenia  Nees)

References

External links
 
 

Acanthaceae
Asterid subfamilies